RSGC1 (Red Supergiant Cluster 1) is a young massive open cluster in the Milky Way galaxy. It was discovered in 2006 in the data generated by several infrared surveys, named for the unprecedented number of red supergiant members.  The cluster is located in the constellation Scutum at the distance of about 6.6 kpc from the Sun. It is likely situated at the intersection of the northern end of the Long Bar of the Milky Way and the inner portion of the Scutum–Centaurus Arm—one of its two major spiral arms.

The age of RSGC1 is estimated at 10–14 million years. The cluster is heavily obscured and has not been detected in visible light. It lies close to other groupings of red supergiants known as Stephenson 2, RSGC3, Alicante 7, Alicante 8, and Alicante 10. The mass of RSGC1 is estimated at 30 thousand solar masses, which makes it one of the most massive open clusters in the Galaxy.

The observed red supergiants with the mass of about 16–20 solar masses are type II supernova progenitors. Fourteen red supergiant members have been identified.

Members

References

Open clusters
Scutum (constellation)
Scutum–Centaurus Arm